Plusia nichollae is a species of looper moth in the family Noctuidae. It is found in North America.

The MONA or Hodges number for Plusia nichollae is 8951.

References

Further reading

 
 
 
 
 
 
 
 
 

Plusiini
Articles created by Qbugbot
Moths described in 1913